Madeleinea is a butterfly genus in the family Lycaenidae. These Andean butterflies are very interesting from a taxonomic standpoint.

This genus was discussed by famous author and lepidopterologist Vladimir Nabokov in 1945. However, he used the name Itylos, which actually refers to a closely related but distinct genus described in 1921. That was not known in his time however, as the relationships of the butterflies discussed by Nabokov were only resolved in 1993. In any case, Nivalis was proposed as a replacement name by Emilio Balletto but for technical reasons turned out to be unavailable. Zsolt Bálint subsequently established the currently-valid name.

The latter researcher, in cooperation with Kurt Johnson, since then described many taxa new to science. To honor the contributions of Nabokov to entomology - chiefly concerning Lycaenidae -, these were often given names referring to the novels of Nabokov, or characters therein.

Selected species
At least one but probably more undescribed species are known to exist.
 Madeleinea ardisensis Bálint & Lamas, 1996 – named after Ardis Hall, a place in Ada or Ardor: A Family Chronicle.
 Madeleinea bella Bálint & Lamas, 1996
 Madeleinea cobaltana Bálint & Lamas, 1994 – named after Kobalt, a mountain resort in Pale Fire
 Madeleinea colca Bálint & Lamas, 1996
 Madeleinea gradoslamasi Bálint & Johnson, 1997
 Madeleinea huascarana Bálint & Lamas, 1994
 Madeleinea koa (Druce, 1896)
 Madeleinea lea Benyamini, Bálint & Johnson, 1995
 Madeleinea lolita Bálint, 1993 – named after Dolores Haze, nicknamed "Lolita", and the protagonist of the novel by the same title.
 Madeleinea ludicra (Weymer, 1890)
 Madeleinea malvasa Bálint & Pyrcz, [2000]
 Madeleinea moza (Staudinger, [1894])
 Madeleinea nodo Bálint & Johnson, 1995 – named after Nodo, half-brother of Odon in Pale Fire.
 Madeleinea odon Bálint & Johnson, 1995 – named after Odon, half-brother of Nodo in Pale Fire.
 Madeleinea pacis (Draudt, 1921)
 Madeleinea pelorias (Weymer, 1890)
 Madeleinea sigal Benyamini, Bálint & Johnson, 1995
 Madeleinea tintarrona Bálint & Johnson, 1995 – named after Tintarron, a brand of deep blue glass in Pale Fire
 Madeleinea vokoban Bálint & Johnson, 1995 – the specific name is "Nabokov" read backwards

References

  (1945): Notes on neotropical Plebejinae (Lycaenidae, Lepidoptera). Psyche 52: 1–61. PDF fulltext
  (1996): A Guide to Nabokov’s Butterflies and Moths. Hamburg, Germany

External links

 Markku Savela's Lepidoptera and some other life forms: Madeleinea. Version of 2007-JUL-11. Retrieved 2007-DEC-30.
 Photo of male Madeleinea ardisensis
 Another photo of male Madeleinea ardisensis, showing underside
 Photo of female Madeleinea cobaltana

Polyommatini
Lycaenidae of South America
Lycaenidae genera